The Dooars or Duars are the alluvial floodplains in eastern-northeastern India that lie south of the outer foothills of the Himalayas and north of the Brahmaputra River basin. The region forms the gateway to Bhutan. It is part of the Terai-Duar savanna and grasslands ecoregion.

Dooars means 'doors' in Assamese, Bengali, Maithili, Bhojpuri, and Magahi languages. There are 18 passages or gateways between the hills in Bhutan and the plains in India. The Western Dooars are also known as the Bengal Dooars, and the Eastern Dooars also as the Assam Dooars. Dooars is analogous with the Terai in northern India and southern Nepal.

History

The Dooars belonged to the Kamata Kingdom under the Koch dynasty; and taking advantage of the weakness of the Koch kingdom in subsequent times, Bhutan took possession of the Dooars. This region was controlled by the kingdom of Bhutan when the British annexed it in 1865 after the Bhutan War under the command of Captain Hedayat Ali. The area was divided into two parts: the eastern part was merged with Goalpara district in Assam and the western part was turned into a new district named Western Dooars. Again in the year 1869, the name was changed to Jalpaiguri district. After the end of the British rule in India in 1947, the Dooars acceded into the dominion of India and it merged with the Union of India shortly afterwards in 1949.

Geography and climate

Political geography

The Dooars region politically constitutes the plains of Kalimpong district, the whole of Jalpaiguri district and Alipurduar district and the upper region of Cooch Behar district in West Bengal and the districts of Kokrajhar and Bongaigaon in the state of Assam.

Physical geography

The elevation of Dooars area ranges from 90 to 1,750 m. Innumerable streams and rivers flow through these fertile plains from the mountains of Bhutan. In Assam, the major rivers are the Brahmaputra and Manas. In northern West Bengal, the major river is the Teesta besides many others like the Jaldhaka, Murti, Torsha, Sankosh, Dyna, Karatoya, Raidak, and Kalchini rivers, among others.

Climate
The average rainfall of the area is about 3,400 mm. Monsoon generally starts from the middle of June and continues till the end of September. Winters are cold with foggy mornings and nights. Summer is mild and constitutes a very short period of the year.

Cities and towns
The Dooars is a large region and is dotted with many towns and cities. The largest cities in the region stretching from the Darjeeling foothills to the Arunachal Pradesh foothills are Siliguri and Jalpaiguri, which both partly lie in the Terai region rather the Dooars, geographically. This northern Bengal cities are well connected with the rest of country by road, air and railway and is the business hub of the region.

The other major cities are Kokrajhar, Bongaigaon, Goalpara, Barpeta and Dhubri in Assam. Cooch Behar, Alipurduar, Dhupguri, Malbazar, Mainaguri, Falakata and Birpara are the major cities of the Dooars in West Bengal, and Kishanganj in Bihar. Also, the commercial capital of Bhutan, Phuentsholing, near Jaigaon, can be considered a part of this region.

Politics
Historically, the region has suffered from ethnic strife. The Bodoland agitation in Assam for a separate state for the Bodo people and the Kamtapur or Greater Cooch Behar movement for a Kamtapur state in northern Bengal for the Rajbongshis are the two most vociferous ones.

Economy of Dooars

The economy of Dooars is based on three "T"s – Tea, Tourism and Timber. The main industry of the Dooars region is the tea industry. Thousands of people are engaged in the tea estates and factories. Several people are also engaged in the cultivation of betel nuts which also contributes to the economy. Cultivation of other crops is done mainly for local consumption.

The area is dotted by several national parks and wildlife sanctuaries which attract a lot of tourists from all over India and abroad, making it an important contributor to the economy and also employer of a number of people.

The timber industry, both legally and illegally, flourishes in this region. A number of saw mills, plywood industries and other allied business also act as an important contributor to the economy.

The Dooars act as doorways to Bhutan; thus, the export-import industry also flourishes in the area. The towns of Jaigaon, Siliguri and Phuentsholing are important hubs of the export-import industry.

As the region is near the international borders of Bhutan, Nepal and Bangladesh, the Border Security Force (BSF), the Central Reserve Police Force (CRPF), Indian army and Indian Air Force maintain a large presence in the area. This leads to a large population of semi-permanent residents who bring money into the local economy.

Flora and fauna

A railway line runs through the tea gardens and the various protected areas and a number of elephants have been killed in collisions with trains.

The beauty of the region lies not only in its tea gardens but also in the dense jungles that make up the countryside. Many wildlife sanctuaries and national park like Manas National Park in Assam, Jaldapara National Park, Buxa Tiger Reserve, Gorumara National Park, Chapramari Wildlife Sanctuary, Chilapata Forests, Rajabhatkhawa Forests , Singalila National Park, Neora Valley National Park and Mahananda Wildlife Sanctuary in West Bengal are located in this region.

A number of endangered animals live in the forests of the Dooars like Bengal tiger, Indian rhinoceros, Indian elephant, chital, sambar, clouded leopard, Indian leopard, gaur, Indian peacock and great Indian hornbill, monitor lizard, Indian Python, Indian cobra, reticulated python. Bear species like sloth bear and Himalayan black bear live up north. Red panda, rhesus macaque, gray langur, binturong, pygmy hog and Indian boar can be found. Indian fox, Indian wolf, spotted linsang are some of the predators. The hispid hare is a very rare species which is found here. Leopard cat and Asian golden cat have been recorded. Himalayan tahr, Bhutan takin, Himalayan goral and Himalayan serow are found. In rivers, mugger crocodiles and gharial have been seen. In lakes, Eurasian spoonbill, brahminy duck, storks, such as painted stork, Indian cormorant, red-naped ibis, kingfisher, and predatory birds like vultures and eagle species have been discovered here. Buxa Tiger Reserve is famous for butterflies, while Jorepokhri is the last refuge for tylototriton verrucosus. Pokhari Lake supports species of catfish.

Transport

The main mode of transport in the area is roadways. Most of the places are well connected by roads. NH31 is the main highway of the area. Asian Highway AH48 is being constructed through the Dooars region.
Regular bus services provided by North Bengal State Transport Corporation and Assam State Transport Corporation and other private parties run between all the important places of the area. Shared jeeps and maxi-taxies are quite popular in the area.
There are some important railway stations in the area such as New Jalpaiguri, New Mal Junction, New Cooch Behar, Alipurduar, New Bongaigaon, Hasimara, Falakata. An important rail route between Alipurduar Junction and New Jalpaiguri via Malbazar covers almost the entire Dooars.
Three important airports of the area are Bagdogra Airport near Siliguri, Cooch Behar Airport  and Guwahati Airport.

See also

 Jayanti
 Bhutanghat
 Buxa Fort
 Malbazar
 Teesta River
 Hasimara
 Coronation Bridge
 Phuntsholing
 Chalsa, India
 Rajabhatkhawa
 Jaldapara
 Jaldhaka River
 Sitai
 Falakata
Terai

References

External links

Encyclopædia Britannica - Duars
Cooch Behar District Website – Dooars
Jalpaiguri District Website
Govt.of West Bengal
Dooars 
About Dooars

 
Regions of West Bengal
Regions of India
Terai-Duar savanna and grasslands